The 1954–55 Scottish Inter-District Championship was a  rugby union competition for Scotland's district teams.

This season saw the second formal Scottish Inter-District Championship.

The district sides selected were Glasgow District, Edinburgh District, North and Midlands and South.

South won the competition with a maximum three wins.

1954-55 League Table

Results

Round 1

Glasgow District: Angus Cameron (Glasgow HSFP), T. E. S. Fergusson (Hillhead HSFP), Allan Cameron (Hillhead HSFP),W. Fraser (Ardrossan Academicals), A. G. Campbell (Kelvinside Academicals), J. T. Docherty (Glasgow HSFP), R. Munro (Jordanhill RFC),D. W. Reid (Allan Glen's F.P), G. M. Guthrie (Hillhead HSFP), F. I. Hogarth (West of Scotland), F. I. Blake (Kilmarnock),Hamish Kemp (Glasgow HSFP) [captain], T. S. Smith (Glasgow University), I. A. A. MacGregor (Hillhead HSFP), H. Roddan (Hutcheson's GSFP)

South: J. R. McCreadie (Hawick), T. Grieve (Langholm), R. G. Charters (Hawick), Les Allan (Melrose), C. Elliot (Langholm),J. M. Maxwell (Langholm), J. Dun (Melrose), A. McEwan (Melrose), J. Telford (Langholm), I. Hastie (Kelso), J. J. Hegarty (Hawick),A. Robson (Hawick), H. Duffy (Jedforest), J. Grant (Hawick), A. K. McRae (Gala)

Round 2

Edinburgh District: J. A. C. Gilbert (Stewart's College F. P.), K. G. Sutherland (Melville's College F. P.), Ken Dalgleish (Edinburgh Wanderers),E. C. Barclay-Smith (Edinburgh Wanderers), T. G. Weatherstone (Stewart's College F. P.) [captain], Graham Ross (Watsonians),J. A. Nichol (Royal HSFP), R. D. S. Munro (Leith Academicals), N. G. R. Mair (Edinburgh University), P. S. Shearer (Heriots F. P.),W. S. Glen (Edinburgh Wanderers), S. T. H. Wright (Stewart's College F. P.), J. C. M. Sharp (Stewart's College F. P.)

North and Midlands: W. Steven (Madras College F. P.), E. H. Cruickshank (Aberdeen GSFP), E. Craig (Aberdeen GSFP),I. S. Gloag (Perthshire Academicals) [captain], J. K. Morrison (Panmure), I. Stuart (Aberdeen GSFP), R. H. W. Cradock (Aberdeen GSFP),A. Tullett (Gordonians), I. L. Robb (Aberdeenshire), D. M. Brien (Perthshire Academicals), J. Johnston (Dunfermline),Ernie Michie (Aberdeen University), M. C. S. Phillip (Aberdeen University), C. D. Mowat (Aberdeen GSFP), E. Rogers (Perthshire Academicals)

Round 3

South: R. Chisholm (Melrose), T. Grieve (Langholm), R. G. Charters (Hawick), J. M. Maxwell (Langholm), C. Elliot (Langholm),J. Hume (Kelso), A. S. Dorward (Gala),  I. Hastie (Kelso), Jock King (Selkirk), J. Campbell (Kelso), J. J. Hegarty (Hawick), T. Elliot (Gala),L. Walker (Selkirk), A. Robson (Hawick) [captain], A. K. McRae (Gala) 

North and Midlands: W. Steven (Madras College F. P.), E. H. Cruickshank (Aberdeen GSFP), E. Craig (Aberdeen GSFP),I. S. Gloag (Perthshire Academicals) [captain], R. H. Gibson (Howe of Fife),  I. Stuart (Aberdeen GSFP), R. H. W. Cradock (Aberdeen GSFP),A. Tullett (Gordonians), I. L. Robb (Aberdeenshire), D. M. Brien (Perthshire Academicals), J. Johnston (Dunfermline),Ernie Michie (Aberdeen University), J. Greenwood (Dunfermline), C. D. Mowat (Aberdeen GSFP), E. Rogers (Perthshire Academicals)

Round 4

South:  R. Chisholm (Melrose), C. Elliot (Langholm),  R. G. Charters (Hawick), J. M. Maxwell (Langholm), W. J.. Grieve (Gala),J. Hume (Kelso), J. H. Bowie (Hawick), H. McLeod (Hawick), Jock King (Selkirk), J. Campbell (Kelso), J. J. Hegarty (Hawick), T. Elliot (Gala),L. H. Walker (Selkirk), A. Robson (Hawick) [captain], A. K. McRae (Gala) 

Edinburgh District: J. A. C. Gilbert (Stewart's College F. P.), K. G. Sutherland (Melville's College F. P.), Ken Dalgleish (Edinburgh Wanderers),H. G. Hay (Edinburgh Academicals), T. G. Weatherstone (Stewart's College F. P.) [captain], Graham Ross (Watsonians), J. A. Nichol (Royal HSFP),W. M. Stephen (Musselburgh), Bill Relph (Stewart's College F. P.), Douglas Muir (Heriots), D. J. Marshall (Edinburgh Academicals),C. Y. Langlands (Stewart's College F. P.), W. S. Glen (Edinburgh Wanderers), S. T. H. Wright (Stewart's College F. P.),William Cowie (Edinburgh Wanderers)

North and Midlands: W. Steven (Madras College F.P), E. H. Cruickshank (Aberdeen GSFP), I. S. Gloag (Perthshire Academicals), R. H. H. Gibson (Howe of Fife), D. J. McPherson (Gordonians), I. Stuart (Aberdeen GSFP), R. H. W. Cradock (Aberdeen GSFP), A. Tullett (Gordonians), C. W. Bravin (Dunfermline), D. M. Brien (Perthshire Academicals), E. J. S. Michie (Aberdeen University), J. Johnston (Dunfermline), C. D. Mowat (Aberdeen GSFP), E. Rogers (Perthshire Academicals)

Glasgow District: Angus Cameron (Glasgow HSFP), T. E. S. Fergusson (Hillhead HSFP), Allan Cameron (Hillhead HSFP),W. Fraser (Ardrossan Academicals), A. G. Campbell (Kelvinside Academicals), J. T. Docherty (Glasgow HSFP), F. A. Ross (Hillhead HSFP),J. C. Dawson (Glasgow Academicals), A. M. Jope (Glasgow University), D. W. Reid (Allan Glen's F.P.), F. I. Blake (Kilmarnock),Hamish Kemp (Glasgow HSFP) [captain], T. S. Smith (Glasgow University), A. Stephen (Glasgow Academicals), I. A. A. MacGregor (Hillhead HSFP)

Round 5

Glasgow District: Angus Cameron (Glasgow HSFP), Allan Cameron (Hillhead HSFP), T.E.S. Fergusson (Hillhead HSFP), C.G. Thomson (Glasgow Academicals) [capt], A.G. Campbell (Kelvinside Academicals), J.T. Docherty (Glasgow HSFP), I. A. Ross (Hillhead HSFP), J.C. Dawson (Glasgow Academicals), A.M. Jope (Glasgow University), D. W. Reid (Allan Glen's FP), F.I. Blake (Kilmarnock), Hamish Kemp (Glasgow HSFP), J.S. Ure (Kelvinside Academicals), Percy Friebe (Glasgow HSFP), I.A.A. MacGregor (Hillhead HSFP)

Edinburgh District: D. H. Crighton (Watsonians), K. G. Sutherland (Melville College FP), D. M. Scott (Watsonians), C. Ross (Stewarts College FP), T. G. Weatherstone (Stewarts College FP) [capt], G. T. Ross (Watsonians), J. A. Nichol (RHS FP), F. Maclachlan (Edinburgh Wanderers), Bill Relph (Stewarts College FP), W. Murchison (Boroughmuir FP), C. Y. Langlands (Stewarts College FP),, D. J. Marshall (Edinburgh Academicals), W. S. Glen (Edinburgh Wanderers), T. A. Herdman (Melville College FP), W. I. D. Elliot (Edinburgh Academicals)

Matches outwith the Championship

Other Scottish matches

Fife: 

Edinburgh District: 

Rest of the West: 

Glasgow District: 

North of Scotland District: 

Midlands District:

Junior matches

Edinburgh District: 

South of Scotland District: 

East: 

West:

Trial matches

Blues Trial: 

Whites Trial: 

Probables: 

Possibles:

English matches

Edinburgh District: 

Northumberland:

International matches

None.

References

1954–55 in Scottish rugby union
1954–55